Sarak may refer to:

Sarak, an Indian caste
Sərək, Azerbaijan
Sarak, Alborz, Iran
Sarak, Gilan, Iran
Sarak, Izeh, Khuzestan Province, Iran
Sarak, Lali, Khuzestan Province, Iran

See also
Sarrak (disambiguation)